= Ida-Simon =

Conceptual artist duo

Ida–Simon
- Known for: Contemporary Art
- Notable work: Permanent Art, The Bum
- Style: Conceptual art
- Website: https://ida-simon.com/

Ida–Simon are a Swedish/Finnish conceptual artist and art director-duo consisting of Ida Jonsson and Simon Saarinen.

== Work ==
Both Jonsson and Saarinen have been professionally active in design and digital marketing since 2013.

In 2019, the duo created “Permanent art”, the first series of artworks embedded on a blockchain. The project gained international publicity due to the fact that anything stored on a blockchain is immutable and permanent. The duo described the project as “internet graffiti that is impossible to remove.”

Later the same year Jonsson and Saarinen created “The Bum”, a web page where visitors can explore the real size of Kim Kardashian’s behind. In February 2020 the duo used the data they had gathered while creating the web page to make a silicon wearable of the bum. The wearable was presented during New York Fashion Week. While some media outlets criticized the piece for appropriating Kim Kardashian, the artists defended it by stating that it's a comment on the "hyperbolic social-media landscape, where everyone’s fighting to stand out".
